Gustave Louis Adolphe Victor Aristide Charles Chaix d'Est-Ange (11 April 1800, Reims - 14 December 1876, Paris) was a French lawyer and politician.

External links
  Nécrologie de Chaix d'Est-Ange
  Portrait on www.lavieremoise.free.fr

Sources
 
 

1800 births
1876 deaths
Politicians from Reims
Members of the 1st Chamber of Deputies of the July Monarchy
Members of the 3rd Chamber of Deputies of the July Monarchy
Members of the 4th Chamber of Deputies of the July Monarchy
Members of the 5th Chamber of Deputies of the July Monarchy
Members of the 6th Chamber of Deputies of the July Monarchy
French Senators of the Second Empire
19th-century French lawyers
Grand Croix of the Légion d'honneur